Takandan Giwa is a small village in Toro Local Government Area, Bauchi State, Nigeria. The village is under a district called Jama`a and the ward called Zaranda.

The village is located along Bauchi - Jos Road. The distance from Bauchi, the capital of Bauchi State, is 47 kilometers. The distance from Jos, the capital of Plateau State, is 79 kilometers.

Reference

https://punchng.com/thirteen-killed-in-bauchi-jos-highway-crashes/

https://dailypost.ng/2020/02/28/13-killed-in-multiple-automobile-accidents-in-bauchi/

Populated places in Bauchi State